Bir al-Basha  is a Palestinian village in the West Bank, located 15 km southwest of the city of Jenin in the northern West Bank. According to the Palestinian Central Bureau of Statistics, the town had a population of 1,307 inhabitants in mid-year 2006.

In the wake of the 1948 Arab–Israeli War, and after the 1949 Armistice Agreements, Bir al-Basha came under Jordanian rule.

It is adjacent to the archaeological site of Tel Dothan.

Post-1967 
Since the Six-Day War in 1967, Bir al-Basha has been  under Israeli occupation.

Footnotes

External links
  Welcome To Beer al-Basha
Survey of Western Palestine, Map 8: IAA, Wikimedia commons

Villages in the West Bank
Jenin Governorate
Municipalities of the State of Palestine